William Collins Speare (August 24, 1915 – May 31, 1999) was a Canadian politician. He served in the Legislative Assembly of British Columbia from 1957 to 1969, as a Social Credit member for the constituency of Cariboo.

References

1915 births
1999 deaths
British Columbia Social Credit Party MLAs
Politicians from Winnipeg